Mobilitalea is a bacterial genus from the family of Lachnospiraceae with one known species (Mobilitalea sibirica).

References

 

Lachnospiraceae
Monotypic bacteria genera
Bacteria genera